Antisleep Vol. 01 is the debut studio album by American multi-genre project Blue Stahli, released in 2008. The majority of the tracks are instrumental. The album was produced by Klayton of Celldweller and it was mixed by Klayton and Bret. The cover artwork was made by Shawn Landis of Virocity.

Track listing

References

2008 debut albums
Blue Stahli albums